Dennis McCoy (born December 29, 1966 in Kansas City, Missouri) is an American freestyle BMX rider. He was a member of the American Freestyle Association along with Mat Hoffman and Dave Mirra and also featured in the 2001 video game Mat Hoffman's Pro BMX as well as the 2002 video game Gravity Games Bike: Street Vert Dirt. Is considered to be a pioneer in freestyle BMX, his credentials include being featured in several Road Fools episodes and managing major action sport competitions and events while still maintaining legendary skill on a BMX bike.

Dennis McCoy received his first sponsorship and turned pro from Bob Haro, of Haro Bicycles in 1984. He also is the longest active competitor in the ESPN X-Games, having been an active competitor since the first event held in Providence, Rhode Island in 1995 through to the 2018 event in Minneapolis, Minnesota. In the 2013 X-Games of Munich, he was an analytical commentator for the Slopestyle Mountain Bike event.

References

External links
 ESPN profile
 

1966 births
Living people
BMX riders
X Games athletes
Sportspeople from Kansas City, Missouri